Country Heart is an album by American country music artist George Jones. It was released in 1966 as a double LP on the Musicor Records label, and was available exclusively through the Columbia Record Club.

Background
Although Country Heart contained several hits Jones had scored with Musicor, it is not actually a greatest hits collection.  It includes a rerecording of Jones's first number one country hit "White Lightnin'" as well as a remake of his hit duet "We Must Have Been Out Of Our Minds" with Melba Montgomery from 1963.  Curiously, the album also features an instrumental version of "The Race Is On", which had gone to number three for Jones in 1964 when he was still with United Artists.  Country Heart also showcases the songwriting talents of Jones friend Earl "Peanut" Montgomery, whom the country star had begun to rely on more heavily for new material. "From Here To The Door" was written by Don Chapel, who was married to Tammy Wynette at the time. 

"Walk Through This World with Me" would become a number one hit for Jones in 1967, his first chart topper in five years.   According to Bob Allen's book George Jones: The Life and Times of a Honky Tonk Legend,  Jones was less than enthusiastic about the "musically middle-of-the-road love ballad that was almost inspirational in its unabashedly optimistic and romantic sentiments - a far cry from 'The Window Up Above,'" and it was only at his producer H.W. "Pappy" Daily's insistence that he recorded the song at all.  "Four-O-Thirty Three" and "Things Have Gone To Pieces" had also been top ten hits for Jones.

Reception
AllMusic's Jim Worbois, while lamenting that a full version of "The Race Is On" is not featured, writes that the set "easily shows why George Jones has long been considered the finest singer in country music."

Track listing
 "Four-O-Thirty-Three" (Earl Montgomery)
 "Let a Little Loving Come In" (Leon Payne)
 "How Proud I Would Have Been" (Joe Poovey)
 "We're Watching Our Step" (E. Montgomery)
 "Old Brush Arbors" (Orbie Ardis, Darrell Edwards)
 "The Race Is On" (Instrumental)
 "Take Me" (George Jones, Payne)
 "Ship of Love" (Leroy Griffin)
 "I Can't Get Used to Being Lonely" (E. Montgomery)
 "Walk Through This World with Me" (Kay Savage, Sandra Seamons)
 "Flowers for Mama" (Eddie Noack, Al Rumley, Cindy Walker)
 "We Must Have Been Out of Our Minds" (with Melba Montgomery) (E. Montgomery)
 "Things Have Gone to Pieces" (Payne)
 "If You Believe" (Darrell Edwards)
 "Gonna Take Me Away from You"
 "Till I Hear It from You" (Jones, Jack Ripley)
 "I'm Wasting Good Paper" (E. Montgomery)
 "White Lightning" (J.P. Richardson)
 "From Here to the Door" (Don Chapel)
 "Don't Keep Me Lonely Too Long" (Melba Montgomery)
 "Sea Between Our Hearts" 
 "Developing My Pictures" (E. Montgomery)
 "I Just Lost My Favorite Girl"
 "Selfishness of Man" (Payne)

References

External links
 George Jones' Official Website

1966 compilation albums
George Jones compilation albums
Musicor Records compilation albums